was a private junior college in Japan which was located in Chiyoda, Tokyo. It was founded in 1950.

Academic departments
 Economics
 Jurisprudence

External links
  

Japanese junior colleges
Universities and colleges in Tokyo
Educational institutions established in 1950
Private universities and colleges in Japan
1950 establishments in Japan